NOAA-1, also known as ITOS-A was a weather satellite operated by the National Oceanic and Atmospheric Administration (NOAA). It was part of a series of satellites called ITOS, or improved TIROS. NOAA-1 was launched on a Delta rocket on December 11, 1970. The launch carried one other satellite: CEP 1. It was deactivated by NOAA on August 19, 1971.

References

External links
 Live Real Time Satellite Tracking and Predictions: NOAA 1. n2yo.com

1970 in spaceflight
Weather satellites of the United States
Spacecraft launched in 1970